The Valley View Stakes is a Grade III American thoroughbred horse race for three-year-old fillies over a distance of  miles on the turf held annually in October at Keeneland Race Course in Lexington, Kentucky during the fall meeting.

History

The event was named in after the Valley View Ferry which connects auto traffic between the county seats of Richmond in Madison County and Nicholasville in Jessamine County and is  widely regarded as the Kentucky's oldest continually operating business.

The event was inaugurated on 11 October 1991 and was won by the 31-1 longshot La Gueriere in a time of 1:43.49. Two weeks later La Gueriere proved that her win was not a fluke by winning the Grade I Queen Elizabeth II Challenge Cup Stakes.

From 1994 to 1998 the event was classified as Listed and in 1999 the event was upgraded to Grade III.

The race was split into two divisions in 2009 and 2012.
 
In 2006 due to inclement weather the event was move to the synthetic track and in 2015 also the event was moved off the turf to the dirt track.

Records
Speed record:  
 1:41.51  - Spinning Round  (1992)

Margins:
7 lengths – Mingling Glances   (1997)

Most wins by an owner
 3 - Augustin Stable  (2010, 2012, 2022)

Most wins by a jockey
 3 - Joe Bravo (1997, 2018, 2019)
 3 - Pat Day (2000, 2003, 2004)

Most wins by a trainer
 4 - H. Graham Motion (2015, 2016, 2018, 2022)

Winners

Legend:

 
 
 

Notes:

§ Ran as an entry

See also 
 List of American and Canadian Graded races

References

Graded stakes races in the United States
Grade 3 stakes races in the United States
Mile category horse races for fillies and mares
Recurring sporting events established in 1991
Keeneland horse races
1991 establishments in Kentucky
Flat horse races for three-year-old fillies